Marko Zalokar (born 18 June 1990) is a Slovenian football goalkeeper who plays for Slovenian PrvaLiga club Maribor.

References

External links
NZS profile 

1990 births
Living people
People from Brežice
Slovenian footballers
Association football goalkeepers
NK Krško players
NŠ Mura players
NK Maribor players
Slovenian Second League players
Slovenian PrvaLiga players